Hurricane Creek is a stream in northern Howard County in the U.S. state of Missouri. It is a tributary of the Missouri River which it enters just south of Glasgow.

Hurricane Creek was named for an incident when a tornado flattened trees in the area.

See also
List of rivers of Missouri

References

Rivers of Howard County, Missouri
Rivers of Missouri